Secret of the Blackbirds is a 1983 Soviet crime film directed by Vadim Derbenyov.

Plot 
The head of a wealthy family, Mr. George Fortescue, has been poisoned. Inspector Neal is investigating and learns that the deceased was an unpleasant person. His death was beneficial to all members of the family. It is not an easy matter, the rarest poison was used for poisoning. The violent death of the maid Gladys, and later the mistress of the house, Adele, completely confuses the investigation. But Miss Marple intervenes.

Cast 
 Ita Ever as Miss Marple
 Vladimir Sedov as Inspector Neele
 Vsevolod Sanaev as George Fortescue
 Lyubov Polishchuk as Adele Fortescue
 Yury Belyayev as Persival Forteskyu (as Yuriy Belyaev)
 Elena Sanaeva as Jennifer Fortescue
 Andrey Kharitonov as Lance Fortescue
 Natalya Danilova as Patricia Fortescue
 Yelena Ivochkina as Elaine Fortescue
 Elza Radzina as Miss Effie Ramsbottom

See also
A Pocket Full of Rye

References

External links 
 

1983 films
1980s Russian-language films
Soviet crime films
Films based on Miss Marple books
1983 crime films